Ellen Reid (born 1983) is an American composer originally from Oak Ridge, Tennessee and living and working in New York City and Los Angeles. Reid is a multi-genre composer whose breadth of work spans classical, opera, sound installations, film scoring, avant-pop, ensemble and chorale writing.

As a classical composer, Reid's work has been performed by the New York Philharmonic, Boston Symphony Orchestra, Los Angeles Philharmonic, RTE, American Composers Orchestra, Los Angeles Chamber Orchestra, and other institutions around the world. Reid is the first to have been commissioned by and have world premieres by all four of Los Angeles's major classical music institutions: Los Angeles Opera, Los Angeles Philharmonic, L.A. Master Chorale and L.A. Chamber Orchestra in addition to being the only female composer to ever have been performed by all four. Since 2019, Reid has served as Creative Advisor and Composer-in-Residence for L.A. Chamber Orchestra.

In 2018, Reid began composing her first opera and in November 2018, p r i s m, about a sexual assault survivor's psychological struggles, premiered in L.A. and was awarded the 2019 Pulitzer Prize for Music. It was also awarded the Music Critics Association of North America's "Best New Opera Award." 

In addition to composing for classical and opera, Reid also scores films. Reid's first feature film score was for the 2014 drama-mystery The Midnight Swim. She also contributed original music to the soundtrack of the 2016 mystery film Buster's Mal Heart and scored Birds of Paradise, a film produced by Amazon Studios and released in October 2021. All of these films were written and directed by Sarah Adina Smith. 

Continuing her multi-faceted career, Reid created Ellen Reid SOUNDWALK in 2020, a GPS-enabled work of public art that uses music to illuminate the natural environment by reimagining urban parks as interactive soundscapes. SOUNDWALK premiered in New York's Central Park, featuring the New York Philharmonic, and continues to expand to parks around the world, including Los Angeles' Griffith Park presented by CAP UCLA, London's Regent's Park & Primrose Hill presented by Wellcome Collection and Tokyo's Uneo Park presented by Spring Festival in Tokyo. SOUNDWALK features music written by Reid for collaborators such as Kronos Quartet, Philadelphia Orchestra, Shabaka Hutchings and Nadia Sirota.

In 2022, Reid began a collaboration with Johan Lenox and Yuga Cohler called isomonstrosity, a pandemic symphony in rap and avant-pop. Reid brings both her classical and synth-based compositions to the album. isomonstrosity features collaborations with 645AR, Kacy Hill and Vic Mensa, among others. The album will be released on November 18th, 2022. 

In addition to her work as a composer, Reid also co-founded a non-profit in 2016 with Missy Mazzoli, Luna Composition Lab. The non-profit is a mentorship program for young self-identified female, non-binary, and gender non-conforming composers. Luna Composition Lab is the only program of its kind in the United States.

Reid graduated from Columbia College of Columbia University in 2005. She earned her MFA at CalArts; her teachers include Anne LeBaron, David Rosenboom, and George Lewis.

References 

1983 births
American classical composers
American women classical composers
American film score composers
American opera composers
Women film score composers
Women opera composers
Living people
Musicians from Los Angeles
Musicians from New York City
Musicians from Tennessee
21st-century American composers
21st-century classical composers
21st-century American women musicians
21st-century women composers
Pulitzer Prize for Music winners
Columbia College (New York) alumni